is an animation studio based in Japan and started in 1986. Mook Animation formed a business alliance with DLE in 2006 and was known as Mook DLE; however they ended their partnership in 2008. Mook has created animation services for Western television programs and feature films, mostly for Hanna-Barbera and later Cartoon Network, such as SWAT Kats (four episodes from the first season and the entire second season), The Real Adventures of Jonny Quest (the second season). They also provided the animation for Æon Flux, Biker Mice from Mars, Men in Black: The Series, Todd McFarlane's Spawn, X-Men: Evolution,  and Transformers: Animated.

Subsidiaries
 Mook Soratia Animation, Inc.(ムークソラティアアニメーション): Established in 2010.
 SORATIA inc. (ソラティア株式会社): Uruma, Okinawa-based production studio.
 NEO Pictures Corporation? (株式会社　ＮＥＯピクチャーズ): Tokyo-based production studio.

Productions

Television series
 Bionic Six (1987) (additional services for TMS Entertainment)
 The Comic Strip (1987) (opening)
 Sylvanian Families (1987) (along with TMS Entertainment)
 Spiral Zone (1987) (additional services for Visual 80) (uncredited)
 ALF Tales (1988-1989) (along with Shaft)
 Beverly Hills Teens (1987)
 Diplodos (1988)
 COPS (1988-1989)
 Video Power (1990–1992)
 Æon Flux (1991-1995)
 The Twins of Destiny (1992)
 King Arthur and the Knights of Justice (1992-1993)
 The Adventures of T-Rex (1992–1993)
 SWAT Kats: The Radical Squadron (1993-1995)
 Biker Mice from Mars (1993-1996)
 Mega Man (1994-1996) (additional services for Ashi Productions)
 Skysurfer Strike Force (1995-1996) (additional services for Ashi Productions)
 Ultraforce (1994-1995) (opening)
 Street Sharks (1994-1997)
 The Real Adventures of Jonny Quest (1996–1997, second season)
 Mummies Alive! (1997, 17 episodes, intro, transformation sequences and stock footage)
 Men in Black: The Series (1997-2001)
 Todd McFarlane's Spawn (1997-1999) (with Madhouse)
 X-Men: Evolution (2000-2003) (with Madhouse)
 Stripperella (2003-2004)
 KITTEN DREAM (2005, NEO Pictures)
 G.I. Joe: Sigma 6 (2005)
 Rocket Girls (2007, as Mook DLE)
 Transformers: Animated (2007–2009, with The Answer Studio and Studio 4°C)

OVA
 Animated Classics II (Aladdin, Pinocchio, Etc.) (1992-1993)
 Scooby-Doo on Zombie Island (1998)
 Scooby-Doo! and the Witch's Ghost (1999)
 Hunchback Story (1999)
 Triangle Heart: Sazanami Joshiryō (2000-2002)
 Scooby-Doo and the Alien Invaders (2000)
 Scooby-Doo and the Cyber Chase (2001)
 The Toys Room (2001)
 Sin in The Rain (2006)
 Mosaic (2007)
 The Condor (2007)

Others
 Dosukoi! Wanpaku Dohyou (feature) (1994)
 COLUBOCCORO (pilot) (2007)
 Shimanchu MiRiKa (pilot) (2010, tied Media franchise to Okinawa Prefecture.)

References

External links
 Mook Animation, Inc. page
 Mook DLE Inc. page
 SORATIA inc. page
 
 co-productions database

Japanese animation studios
Mass media companies established in 1986
Japanese companies established in 1986